KTTW (channel 7) is a religious television station in Sioux Falls, South Dakota, United States, owned and operated by Tri-State Christian Television (TCT) with transmitter in Rowena, South Dakota. It is rebroadcast on KTTM in Huron, whose transmitter is located near Alpena, South Dakota. KTTM covers areas of south-central and southeastern South Dakota that receive a marginal to non-existent over-the-air signal from KTTW. 

Established as a Fox affiliate on channel 17 in 1987, KTTW was the fourth commercial station to be built in Sioux Falls and the first Fox affiliate in the state. KTTM went on the air in 1991. Its owner, Independent Communications, Inc., sold the programming and Fox affiliation, as well as its five dependent translators, to Gray Television in 2020, resulting in the establishment of Fox Sioux Falls, a subchannel of KDLT-TV. It then sold the KTTW and KTTM facilities and licenses to Radiant Life Ministries, a sister company of TCT.

History
After applying on June 1, 1984, the Federal Communications Commission (FCC) granted Family Broadcasting Company, Inc., of Fairfield, Iowa, a construction permit to build a new commercial television station on channel 17 in Sioux Falls in November of that year. Work began in earnest in 1986, and the station began broadcasting on May 29, 1987. Family Broadcasting soon reorganized as Independent Communications, Inc. Upon sign-on, channel 17 affiliated with Fox, which had launched its prime time schedule only a month earlier. However, Fox did not consider itself a network at the time, but a "satellite-delivered national program service" that only carried programming on weekends. Thus, for all intents and purposes, KTTW was programmed as an independent, as was the case with most early Fox affiliates. It filled the weekday schedule with cartoons, home shopping shows, and fare from the Hit Video USA service and American Christian Television System. Chuck Poppen was the general manager, with rental company owner Jim Elmen as the major financial backer of the venture; the Elmens would own 89 percent of KTTW. Elmen recalled in 1991 that he bought into the station to give viewers a chance to see programming that had previously only been seen on cable, particularly children's programming. By then, the station had significantly upgraded its programming, airing both Star Trek: The Original Series and Star Trek: The Next Generation as well as Minnesota Twins baseball and Minnesota Timberwolves basketball.

On August 31, 1991, KTTM signed on, expanding coverage to cities including Huron and Mitchell. By this time, the station had turned the corner from what Elmen would recall as "a couple year of H-E-double-L" financially. The station moved to offices on West 11th Street in 1995, which it would occupy for 25 years. In 1997, Poppen resigned, citing differences with the majority stakeholders. After the digital television transition, in 2009, KTTW changed its branding from its former analog channel 17 to its digital physical channel of 7.

On November 2, 2020, KTTW's non-license assets were purchased by Gray Television, owner of ABC affiliate KSFY-TV (channel 13) and NBC affiliate KDLT-TV (channel 46); Fox programming moved to KDLT on digital subchannel 46.2. Cozi TV, which was also carried on KTTW, moved to subchannel 46.4. KTTW and KTTM's main channels began carrying This TV. Independent also sold five translators of KTTW, at Aberdeen, Brookings, Pierre, Watertown, and Worthington, Minnesota, to Gray for $1. According to a local business publication, Independent Communications was exiting television altogether and intended to sell or donate KTTW "to a nonprofit entity in the near future". On February 10, 2021, it was announced that Marion, Illinois–based Tri-State Christian Television would acquire the license assets of KTTW/KTTM for $850,000. The transaction was completed on December 21; the stations switched to TCT programming the next day.

Technical information

Subchannels
KTTW and KTTM both broadcast TCT and additional national multicast channels:

Analog-to-digital conversion
Both stations shut down their analog signals for the 2009 analog shutoff date:
 KTTW shut down its analog signal, over UHF channel 17; the station's digital signal broadcasts on its pre-transition VHF channel 7.
 KTTM shut down its analog signal, over VHF channel 12; the station's digital signal relocated from its pre-transition UHF channel 22 to VHF channel 12.

Note

References

Tri-State Christian Television affiliates
This TV affiliates
Laff (TV network) affiliates
Bounce TV affiliates
Grit (TV network) affiliates
Defy TV affiliates
TrueReal affiliates
Quest (American TV network) affiliates
Twist (TV network) affiliates
Television channels and stations established in 1987
1987 establishments in South Dakota
TTW